In numerical mathematics, interval propagation or interval constraint propagation is the problem of contracting interval domains associated to variables of R without removing any value that is consistent with a set of constraints (i.e., equations or inequalities). It can be used to propagate uncertainties in the situation where errors are represented by intervals.  Interval propagation considers an estimation problem as a constraint satisfaction problem.

Atomic contractors 
A contractor associated to an equation involving the variables x1,...,xn is an operator which contracts the intervals [x1],..., [xn] (that are supposed to enclose the xi's) without removing any value for the variables that is consistent with the equation.

A contractor is said to be atomic if it is not built as a composition of other contractors. The main theory that is used to build atomic contractors are based on interval analysis.

Example. Consider for instance the equation

 

which involves the three variables x1,x2 and x3.

The associated contractor is given by the following statements

 

 

 

For instance, if 

 

 

 

the contractor performs the following calculus

 

 

 

For other constraints, a specific algorithm for implementing the atomic contractor should be written. An illustration is the atomic contractor associated to the equation

 

is provided by Figures 1 and 2.

Decomposition 
For more complex constraints, a decomposition into atomic constraints (i.e., constraints for which an atomic contractor exists) should be performed. Consider for instance the constraint

 

could be decomposed into

 

 

 

The interval domains that should be associated to the new intermediate variables are

Propagation 

The principle of the interval propagation is to call all available atomic contractors until no more contraction could be observed. 

As a result of the Knaster-Tarski theorem, the procedure always converges to intervals which enclose all feasible values for the variables.  A formalization of the interval propagation can be made thanks to the contractor algebra.  Interval propagation converges quickly to the result and can deal with problems involving several hundred of variables.

Example 

Consider the electronic circuit of Figure 3.
 Assume that from different measurements, we know that

 

 

 

 

 

 

 

From the circuit, we have the following equations

 

 

 

 

After performing the interval propagation, we get

References

Algebra of random variables
Numerical analysis
Statistical approximations